The hooded warbler (Setophaga citrina) is a New World warbler. It breeds in eastern North America and across the eastern United States and into southernmost Canada (Ontario). It is migratory, wintering in Central America and the West Indies. Hooded warblers are very rare vagrants to western Europe.

Recent genetic research has suggested that the type species of Wilsonia (hooded warbler W. citrina) and of Setophaga (American redstart S. ruticilla) are closely related and should be merged into the same genus. As the name Setophaga (published in 1827) takes priority over Wilsonia (published in 1838), hooded warbler would then be transferred as Setophaga citrina. This change has been accepted by the North American Classification Committee of the American Ornithologists' Union, and the IOC World Bird List. The South American Classification Committee continues to list the bird in the genus Wilsonia.

Taxonomy
The French polymath Georges-Louis Leclerc, Comte de Buffon described the hooded warbler in 1779 in his Histoire Naturelle des Oiseaux from a specimen collected in Louisiana. The bird was also illustrated in a hand-coloured plate engraved by François-Nicolas Martinet in the Planches Enluminées D'Histoire Naturelle which was produced under the supervision of Edme-Louis Daubenton to accompany Buffon's text.  Neither the plate caption nor Buffon's description included a scientific name but in 1783 the Dutch naturalist Pieter Boddaert coined the binomial name Muscicapa citrina in his catalogue of the Planches Enluminées.

The hooded warbler was formerly placed in the genus Wilsonia. A molecular phylogenetic study of the family Parulidae published in 2010 found that the hooded warbler was embedded in a clade that contained species then assigned to Dendroica as well as two of four species of Parula and the monotypic genera Catharopeza and Setophaga. To create a monophyletic genus, all members of the clade were placed in the expanded genus Setophaga, which under the rules of the International Code of Zoological Nomenclature, had priority. The genus Setophaga had been introduced by the English naturalist William Swainson in 1827.
The species is monotypic; no subspecies are recognised.

Description

The hooded warbler has a wingspan of 6.9 in (17.5 cm). It has a plain olive/green-brown back, and yellow underparts. Their outer rectrices have whitish vanes. Males have distinctive black hoods which surround their yellow faces; the female has an olive-green cap which does not extend to the forehead, ears and throat instead. Males attain their hood at about 9–12 months of age; younger birds are essentially identical to (and easily confused with) females. The song is a series of musical notes which sound like: wheeta wheeta whee-tee-oh, for which a common mnemonic is "The red, the red T-shirt" or "Come to the woods or you won't see me". The call of these birds is a loud chip.

Life history
These birds feed on insects, which are often found in low vegetation or caught by flycatching. Hooded warblers' breeding habitats are broadleaved woodlands with dense undergrowth. These birds nest in low areas of a bush, laying three to five eggs in a cup-shaped nest. Hooded warblers are often the victims of brood parasitism by the brown-headed cowbird, especially where the hooded warblers' forest habitats are fragmented. In areas with protected woodlands or recovering wooded habitat, the hooded warbler population is stable and possibly increasing.

Gallery

References

External links

Hooded warbler species account – Cornell Lab of Ornithology
Hooded warbler – Wilsonia citrina – USGS Patuxent Bird Identification InfoCenter
Stamps (for Cuba, Saint Vincent and the Grenadines) with Range Map at bird-stamps.org
 
 
 Hooded warbler bird sound at Florida Museum of Natural History
 

hooded warbler
Native birds of the Eastern United States
Birds of Appalachia (United States)
Birds of Central America
Birds of the Caribbean
Birds of the Dominican Republic
hooded warbler
Taxa named by Pieter Boddaert
Birds of Mexico
Birds of the Yucatán Peninsula